Justiniano Solis Montano Sr. (September 5, 1905 – March 31, 2005) was a Filipino politician who was elected for one term to the Philippine Senate and for multiple terms as a member of the House of Representatives.

Background
Montano was born in Amaya, Santa Cruz de Malabon (now Tanza), Cavite to Julian Montano. Sr. and Irene Solis of Tanza, Cavite. He graduated from Tanza Elementary school and high school at the University of the Philippines. Montano would also obtain his Bachelor of Laws at the College of Law of the same university, garnering a rare 100% bar rating in civil law.

He was married to Ligaya Nazareno of Naic, Cavite with whom he had seven children.

Political career
Montano was appointed as deputy fiscal of Cavite from 1930 to 1932. Except for the one term he was elected to the Senate, Montano was elected congressman representing his home province Cavite for numerous terms from 1935 to 1973. As a lawmaker, he succeeded in abolishing the exorbitant yearly pension of an old wealthy general and also authored and sponsored Act. No. 32, better known as the “Montano Law” which provides confiscation of vast haciendas in Cavite and their partitioning among the tenants working on them.

In 1949, Montano won a seat in the Philippine Senate and authored the resolution creating the powerful Blue Ribbon Committee, tasked with investigating graft and corruption. Montano was also a member of the Commission on Appointments and the Senate Electoral Tribunal.

Montano returned to the House of Representatives after his Senate term expired in 1955. During the 5th and 6th Congress, he served as majority floor leader, while he served as minority floor leader during the early part of the 7th Congress. Montano's congressional career ended when Congress was abolished by President Ferdinand Marcos after the declaration of martial law in 1972.

Retirement and death
Montano died on March 31, 2005. At the time of his death at age 99, he was the oldest surviving former Filipino senator.

References

External links 
Official Senate Profile

1905 births
2005 deaths
People from Tanza, Cavite
Liberal Party (Philippines) politicians
Senators of the 2nd Congress of the Philippines
Members of the House of Representatives of the Philippines from Cavite
20th-century Filipino lawyers
University of the Philippines alumni
Majority leaders of the House of Representatives of the Philippines
Minority leaders of the House of Representatives of the Philippines
Members of the National Assembly of the Philippines
Senators of the 3rd Congress of the Philippines